Muravey may refer to:

People
Muravey Radev

Places
Muravey, Altai Krai
Muravey, Bashkortostan

Other
Muravey-class patrol boat
Muravey (scooter)
Muravey VTS